Penderry is the name of an electoral ward and a community in the City and County of Swansea, Wales, UK.  Penderry does not have a community council.

Penderry is bordered by the wards of Mynydd-Bach to the east; Cockett and Cwmbwrla to the south; and Kingsbridge, Penllergaer and Llangyfelach to the north.

For the purposes of local council elections, the ward is divided up into a number of polling districts, which are: Blaen-y-Maes, Caereithin, Mynydd Cadle, Penlan West, Penlan East and Clwyd.

Penderry returns three councillors to the local council.  The current councillors representing Penderry are: June Burtonshaw (Labour), Doreen Jones (Labour) and Grenville Phillips (Labour).

The electoral ward consists of some or all of the following geographical areas:  Penlan, Portmead, Blaen-y-Maes, Fforesthall and Caereithin, in the parliamentary constituency of Swansea East.  The ward consists of mainly suburban residential areas.

2012 local council elections
The turnout for the 2012 local council elections in Penderry was 22.23%.  The results were:

Districts

Penlan
Penlan is the largest area in the centre of the ward.

Blaen-y-Maes
Blaen-y-Maes is an area to the west of the ward.

Swansea electoral wards
Communities in Swansea